Open Door Christian School is a private, coeducational, K-12 Christian school in Elyria, Ohio.  It is a non-profit, non-denominational ministry of Church of the Open Door. Their school mascot is the Patriot and their colors are white and royal blue. Open Door Christian School is often referred to as 'ODCS'.
ODCS offers many athletic opportunities:

Fall-
Soccer(Jr.High co-ed, Boys & Girls Varsity, Boys JV)
Cross Country(Jr.High co-ed, Boys & Girls Varsity)
Cheerleading(Girls Varsity)
Volleyball(Jr.High Girls, JV & Varsity Girls)
Golf(Varsity co-ed)

Winter-
Basketball(Jr.High Boys & Girls, Freshman Boys, JV & Varsity Boys & Girls)
Bowling(Varsity, co-ed, Boys JV)
Cheerleading(JV, Varsity Girls)

Spring-
Baseball(Varsity Boys)
Softball(Varsity Girls)
Track & Field(Jr.High co-ed, Varsity co-ed)

They also feature an elementary play in the winter, a high school play in the fall, and a high school and middle school play in the spring.

External links
School Website.
Church of the Open Door

Notes and references

Christian schools in Ohio
Private schools in Ohio
High schools in Lorain County, Ohio